Kathleen Bardovi-Harlig is an American linguist. She is currently Provost Professor and ESL Coordinator at Indiana University (Bloomington).

Education and research
She obtained her Bachelor of Arts degree in Linguistics in 1976 and a Master of Arts degree in Linguistics in 1978 at the California State University, Northridge. She earned her PhD in linguistics from the University of Chicago in 1983, with a dissertation entitled, A Functional Approach to English Sentence Stress.

Her primary research interests are second-language temporality and tense-mood-aspect systems and interlanguage pragmatics.

Bardovi-Harlig is credited for the creation of the Coordination Index (CI) which was published in the TESOL Quarterly in 1992 and since then has been considered as the only reliable measure of coordination.

Awards and honors
1999: TESOL- Newbury House Distinguished Research Award (with co-author: Zoltán Dörnyei) for "Do language learners recognize pragmatic violations? Pragmatic vs. grammatical awareness in instructed L2 learning." TESOL Quarterly, 32, 233-259. Original video task can be found at: https://www.iub.edu/~celtie/pedagogy/bardovi_harlig/scenes_from_school.html
Professor Bardovi-Harlig served as president of the American Association for Applied Linguistics (AAAL) from 2007 to 2008.

Selected publications

Books
 Bardovi-Harlig, K. (2000). Tense and aspect in second language acquisition: Form, meaning, and use. Oxford: Blackwell.
 Bardovi-Harlig, K., & Hartford, B. (Eds.) (2005). Interlanguage Pragmatics: Exploring Institutional Talk. Mahwah, NJ: Erlbaum.
 Bardovi-Harlig, K., & Mahan-Taylor, R. (2003). Teaching Pragmatics. Washington, DC: United States Department of State.
 Bardovi-Harlig, K. (2012). Second language acquisition. In R. Binnick (Ed.) Handbook of tense and aspect (pp. 481–503). Oxford: Oxford University Press.
 Bardovi-Harlig, K. (2012). Pragmatics in SLA. In S. M. Gass & A. Mackey (Eds.) The Routledge handbook of second language acquisition (pp. 147–162). London: Routledge/Taylor Francis.

Articles

Bardovi-Harlig, K. (2013). Developing L2 pragmatics. Language Learning, 63:Suppl.1, 68–86.

References

External links
Faculty Page at IU
American Association of Applied Linguisitics

Linguists from the United States
Living people
University of Chicago alumni
Indiana University faculty
Women linguists
Applied linguists
1955 births
Presidents of the American Association for Applied Linguistics